Bakugan: Mechtanium Surge is the fourth and final season of the Japanese anime television series Bakugan Battle Brawlers. The series originally had 26 episodes ordered, however, Nelvana announced that this series would be extended to 46 episodes total in length, with production by TMS Entertainment and Maxpire Entertainment. Unlike the other seasons, Mechtanium Surge is split into two separate stories. The series premiered in Canada on February 13, 2011, United States on March 5, 2011 and Australia on March 8, 2011 on Cartoon Network.

On January 15, 2012, CoroCoro Comics announced that a series was in production that would feature the characters from the BakuTech! Manga. It premiered on April 7, 2012, on TV Tokyo.

The original version of Mechtanium Surge began airing in Taiwan on August 11, 2012 on YoYo TV every Saturday; also, this program began airing in Hong Kong on October 25, 2012 on TVB every weekday. Taiwan aired the original version of New Vestroia six months before Japan. The TW/HK version of Mechtanium Surge uses the original Japanese score, but the opening theme audio is "Cho! Saikyou! Warriors" which is New Vestroia's OP (and the Gundalian Invaders in overseas version including Taiwan and Hong Kong did the same, except for Japan version). 35 seconds (throughout the whole video) of the TW/HK version opening theme video is that of the original Japanese version, while the rest are scenes from various episodes.


Episode list

References

External links

 Nelvana's Bakugan: Mechtanium Surge website 

2011 Canadian television seasons
2012 Canadian television seasons
Mechtanium Surge
2011 Japanese television seasons
2012 Japanese television seasons